Catawba is a village in Price County, Wisconsin, United States. The population was 110 at the 2010 census. The village is located within the Town of Catawba.

Geography
Catawba is located at  (45.535969, -90.530445).

Demographics

2010 census
As of the census of 2010, there were 110 people, 60 households, and 31 families living in the village. The racial makeup of the village was 100.0% White. Hispanic or Latino of any race were 0.9% of the population.

There were 60 households, of which 13.3% had children under the age of 18 living with them, 41.7% were married couples living together, 5.0% had a female householder with no husband present, 5.0% had a male householder with no wife present, and 48.3% were non-families. 41.7% of all households were made up of individuals, and 16.7% had someone living alone who was 65 years of age or older. The average household size was 1.83 and the average family size was 2.45.

The median age in the village was 52 years. 13.6% of residents were under the age of 18; 2.7% were between the ages of 18 and 24; 21% were from 25 to 44; 45.5% were from 45 to 64; and 17.3% were 65 years of age or older. The gender makeup of the village was 51.8% male and 48.2% female.

2000 census
As of the census of 2000, there were 149 people, 68 households, and 48 families living in the village. The population density was 33.4 people per square mile (12.9/km2). There were 79 housing units at an average density of 17.7 per square mile (6.8/km2). The racial makeup of the village was 99.33% White, and 0.67% from two or more races. 38.1% were of German, 15.9% Irish, 7.1% Czech, 6.2% Norwegian and 5.3% Polish ancestry according to Census 2000.

There were 68 households, out of which 26.5% had children under the age of 18 living with them, 48.5% were married couples living together, 10.3% had a female householder with no husband present, and 29.4% were non-families. 26.5% of all households were made up of individuals, and 13.2% had someone living alone who was 65 years of age or older. The average household size was 2.19 and the average family size was 2.58.

In the village, the population was spread out, with 18.1% under the age of 18, 6.7% from 18 to 24, 28.9% from 25 to 44, 25.5% from 45 to 64, and 20.8% who were 65 years of age or older. The median age was 44 years. For every 100 females, there were 109.9 males. For every 100 females age 18 and over, there were 117.9 males.

The median income for a household in the village was $26,250, and the median income for a family was $28,125. Males had a median income of $29,063 versus $22,361 for females. The per capita income for the village was $18,319. There were 4.3% of families and 6.0% of the population living below the poverty line, including 12.0% of under eighteens and 5.4% of those over 64.

References

Villages in Price County, Wisconsin
Villages in Wisconsin